Naoboicha Assembly constituency is one of the 126 assembly constituencies of Assam a north east state of India. Naoboicha is also part of Lakhimpur Lok Sabha constituency.

Members of Legislative Assembly
 1967: Bhupen Hazarika, Independent
 1972: Lila Kanta Das, Indian National Congress
 1978: Afazuddin Ahmed, Independent
 1983: Afazuddin Ahmed, Indian National Congress
 1985: Jagot Hazarika, Independent
 1991: Moni Kumar Subba, Indian National Congress
 1996: Moni Kumar Subba, Indian National Congress
 1998: Moniram Pathori, Asom Gana Parishad
 2001: Sultan Sadik, Independent
 2006: Sanjay Raj Subba, Independent
 2011: Sanjay Raj Subba, Indian National Congress
 2016: Mamun Imdadul Haque Chawdhury, All India United Democratic Front
 2021: Bharat Narah, Indian National Congress

Election results

2016 result

2011 result

See also
 Naoboicha
 List of constituencies of Assam Legislative Assembly

References

External links 
 

Assembly constituencies of Assam
Lakhimpur district